The X166 Mercedes-Benz GL-Class is a full-sized luxury SUV produced from 2012 to 2019. It is the second generation model in the GL-Class range, and was renamed GLS as of the 2016 facelift.

Development and launch 
The X166 GL-Class debuted at the 2012 New York International Auto Show and later went on sale in September 2012. Compared to its predecessor, the GL-Class is  taller,  wider,  longer, and up to  lighter.

Equipment 
Options include soft close doors, rear-seat infotainment displays, 20 and 21-inch wheel options, and an off-road package that adds an increased ride height, a skid plate, and a low-range gearbox. The GL-Class is also available with driver assistance systems such as active cruise control, lane-departure warning, and blind-spot monitoring systems.

Models

Petrol engines

Diesel engines

GL 63 AMG version 

The GL63 AMG was introduced at the 2013 Los Angeles Auto Show. It is mated to a 7-speed AMG SPEEDSHIFT PLUS semi-automatic transmission, with Efficiency, Sport, and Manual modes. Additional features include upgraded brakes, a sports exhaust, AMG exterior and interior styling, 21-inch 5-spoke alloy wheels, and an air suspension system that automatically lowers the car at higher speeds.

2016 facelift 
The facelift was unveiled in November 2015 with production beginning from January 2016.

The GL-Class model range was renamed to GLS to correspond with the new Mercedes naming scheme. The exterior now featured full LED tail-lights and a revised front fascia with updated LED headlights, grille, and bumpers. New exterior paint colours and alloy-wheel designs were also introduced.

Interior changes include a revised instrument panel and new 3-spoke multifunction steering wheel, as well as an upgraded free-standing 8-inch COMAND system display with Apple CarPlay and Android Auto support.

GL500 and GL63 AMG models received performance improvements, and the 7-speed automatic was replaced by the 9-speed 9G-Tronic transmission.

Sales figures 
The following are the sales figures for the X166 GL-Class:

Note: 2012 sales figures include the previous generation model.

Awards 
 2013 MotorTrend "SUV of the Year"
 2017 Car and Driver "10Best Award" in the large SUV category

References

External links 
 

GL-Class (X166)
Cars introduced in 2012
Luxury sport utility vehicles
All-wheel-drive vehicles
2010s cars